The 2022–23 Kerala Premier League group stage started from 20 November 2022. A total of 22 teams compete for the 2022–23 Kerala Premier League championship. The fixtures were announced on 15 November.

Teams
KFA

Group A
<onlyinclude>

Fixtures
Source: 
 Cancelled matches

Group B
<onlyinclude>

Fixtures
Source: 
 Cancelled matches

Group C
<onlyinclude>

Fixtures
Source: 
 Cancelled matches

References

Kerala Premier League seasons